The Philippine Science High School - Central Luzon Campus (shortened to PSHS-CLC) is the 11th campus of the Philippine Science High School System which admits and grants scholarships to students who are gifted in science and mathematics. Admission to this campus is by passing the National Competitive Examination organized and conducted by the PSHS System annually and only Filipino citizens are qualified to attend. Most of the scholars are from Central Luzon which covers the provinces of Aurora, Bataan, Bulacan, Nueva Ecija, Pampanga, Tarlac, and Zambales. Some of the scholars came from neighboring provinces like Manila, Batangas, Rizal, Laguna, Pangasinan, and Palawan. Philippine Science High School - Central Luzon Campus excels both at academics and at co - curricular activities.

History

Philippine Science High School System

The first Philippine Science High School was established in Diliman, Quezon City under Republic Act No. 3661, known as the PSHS Charter which was signed into law in 1964 by President Diosdado Macapagal. This charter mandates the PSHS to a secondary course with emphasis on subjects pertaining to service offered on a free scholarship basis with the end in view of preparing its students for a science career. The school opened on 5 September 1964 at a rented building owned by the Philippine Government Employees Association along Elliptical Road, Diliman, Quezon City. It was only in 1970 that the school moved to its present campus along Agham Road, Diliman, Quezon City.  In 1997, the PSHS System Law (R.A. 8496) was signed by President Fidel V. Ramos. It established the PSHS System and unified all the existing campuses into a single system of governance and management. In 2001, the PSHS System Law was further amended by R.A. No. 9036 consolidating the power and authority over all PSHS System campuses into a single Board of Trustees to ensure uniform policy coordination, standards, and management.

Philippine Science High School Central Luzon Campus
Since its pilot year in 2009, PSHS-CLC has been renting a portion of Clark Polytechnic School in Clark Freeport Zone.  The first campus site was proposed by the Clark Development Corporation (CDC) to be in the Sacobia Area but due to the concerns of the indigenous people on their Ancestral Domain Rights, the campus site was transferred to Air Force City in 2011.  However, issues on technicality hindered the realization of finally establishing the permanent structures of PSHS-CLC in Air Force City.  Finally, in 2012, CDC succeeded in imparting a 3-hectare land in Lily Hill for PSHS-CLC.

The signing of MOA on July 19, 2012, concluded the 3-year search for a permanent site for PSHS-CLC with the help of CDC.  Finally, the elusive dream of the PSHS-CLC community has been met.  CDC President Oban mentioned in his message during the MOA signing:  “In Clark, we transform dreams into reality.”

On April 13, 2016, the Bases Conversion and Development Authority (BCDA) and the Philippine Science High School Central Luzon Campus partnered to establish a large-scale Fabrication Laboratory within the new Clark Green City, a new metropolis to be established north of Manila. The agreement grants for the BCDA to set aside a five-hectare parcel of land for the PSHS-CLC Extension within the Clark Green City.

COVID-19 Pandemic 
In March 2020 (during the Third Quarter of Academic Year 2019-2020), classes were suspended due to COVID-19 safety protocols. No classes were held from this time until August, where the Bridging Program was held to allow students to learn key concepts from the fourth quarter, which they missed due to the class suspensions. From AY 2020-2021 to AY 2021-2022, the school held virtual classes through synchronous classes via Google Meet and asynchronous activities administered through the system's Knowledge Hub (or KHub) based on the Moodle e-learning platform. In April 2022, limited face-to-face classes were held for Grade 11 and 12 students for core science courses. In June 2022, it was announced by the PSHS system that the campus will be returning to a full face-to-face setup starting AY 2022-2023.

Admission 
Grade 6 students who want to apply in the National Competitive Examination must belong to the upper 10% of the batch and do not have a grade below 80% as certified by the School Principal or Registrar. If the applicant does not belong to the upper 10%, he/she should have a special aptitude in Science and Math as evidenced by the report card, with at least a final grade of 85% in Science and Math and 80% in all other subjects.

Academic grading system
The Philippine Science High School uses a grading system similar to the major universities in the country. Grading is cumulative, taking two-thirds of the grade earned for the current quarter (i.e. the transmuted grade, such as 1.25) and adding it to a third of the transmuted grade from the previous quarter.

Note: The percentage range is used in actual computations while the equivalent range is used to translate grades for external usage.

Director's List
A student who garners a weighted average of 1.509 or better qualifies on an honor roll known as the Director's List each quarter.
Note: The distinction of 1.509 is important as only two decimal places are considered. If the weighted average is actually greater than 1.500, even by just a hundredth, the student still becomes part of the list.

Highest Honors/High Honors
A graduating student who garners a General Weighted Average (GWA) of at least 1.500 will graduate with High Honors. While those who garner a GWA of 1.200 and higher will be granted with Highest Honors.

School Activities
The Philippine Science High School Central Luzon Campus holds several school activities every year. One of these include the annual Science Camp which is usually held in the third quarter of every school year in different provinces of Central Luzon, where students get to participate in various STEM-related activities culminating in the Agham-azing Race, a game done throughout an entire day inspired by The Amazing Race. This was held virtually in 2021 due to COVID-19 restrictions, with separate events for FAYP students (Grades 7 to 10) and SYP students (Grades 11 to 12).

The campus also has multiple clubs, including:

 The Central Scholar, the official English language school publication;
 Bahaghari, the official Filipino language school publication;
 Kalasaglahi, the UNESCO Accredited Social Science club;
 MUN CLC, the Model United Nations organization.

External links
PSHS Central Luzon Campus Official Website
PSHS Central Luzon Campus Website Mandate
Admission for NCE

References 

Central Luzon Campus
Schools in Angeles City
High schools in Pampanga